Something in the City is a 1950 British comedy film directed by Maclean Rogers and starring Richard Hearne, Garry Marsh and Ellen Pollock. It includes an early uncredited performance by Stanley Baker as a police constable.

Plot
Mr Ningle has been living a lie for seven years by pretending to still be commuting to his financial services job in the City of London from which he had been sacked. Every day, he journeys in and changes into the disguise of his alter ego: an artist who sells paintings on the pavement in Trafalgar Square.

His life is thrown into turmoil when his deception is nearly discovered by Mr. Holley, the father of his daughter Beryl's new fiancé, Richard. The father happens to be the managing editor of the Evening Courier newspaper, and worried about his prospective in-laws. A series of misunderstandings lead to the mistaken belief that Ningle has been murdered by "Arty the artist", leading to a massive police manhunt. Ningle manages to stage a fake suicide for Arty, while he reappears and pretends he had amnesia for the past 48 hours.

When Holley publishes an offer of a large sum to Arty by way of apology (having heard that he committed suicide), Ningle cannot resist "resurrecting" the artist, but Holley now suspects the truth. Ningle manages to outmanoeuvre him, however, and presents the money to Beryl and Richard, enabling them to marry despite the opposition of Richard's parents.

Cast
 Richard Hearne as Mr. Ningle
 Garry Marsh as Mr. Holley
 Ellen Pollock as Mrs. Holley
 Betty Sinclair as Mrs. Ningle
 Tom Gill as Richard [Holley]
 Diana Calderwood as Beryl [Ningle]
 Bill Shine as Reporter
 Dora Bryan as Waitress
 Molly Weir as Nellie
 George Merritt as Police Inspector
 Horace Kenney as Squeaker Man
 Stanley Vilven as News Vendor
 Gerald Rex as Map Seller
 Vi Kaley as Old Vera
 Ben Williams as Policeman
 Esme Beringer as Miss Prouncey
 Kenneth Henry as City Man
 Mackenzie Ward as Chelsea Artist
 Stanley Baker as Policeman (uncredited)

Production
The film was made at Nettlefold Studios in Walton-on-Thames and on location around London. The film's director, Maclean Rogers, was experienced in second feature productions. It was distributed by Butcher's Film Service.

References

External links

1950 films
1950 comedy films
British comedy films
Films directed by Maclean Rogers
Films set in London
Films set in England
Films shot at Nettlefold Studios
British black-and-white films
1950s English-language films
1950s British films